The 33rd European Women's Artistic Gymnastics Championships were held from 17 to 20 December 2020 in Mersin, Turkey. The competition was originally scheduled to be held from 30 April to 3 May 2020 in Paris, France, but it was rescheduled due to the COVID-19 pandemic. Baku, Azerbaijan was announced as the replacement host for 17 to 20 December, before the event was relocated to Mersin. Originally an Olympic qualifying event, the competition was undesignated as such in light of the ongoing pandemic, so as to avoid pressuring member federations to attend if they were not willing to do so.

Only 15 nations opted to send athletes, as the majority of countries withdrew out of concerns regarding the COVID-19 pandemic in Europe. European Gymnastics barred the Polish Gymnastics Federation from sending any athletes due to outstanding financial obligations resulting from their hosting the 2019 edition of the event.

Schedule

Medals summary

Medalists

Medal standings

Overall

Senior

Junior

Senior results

Team competition 
Only six teams advanced to the team final rather than the traditional eight. Ukraine won its first-ever team title, while qualification leader Romania faltered to score five points lower than in qualifications and narrowly finish in second. Hungary's bronze medal is the nation's first in the team event.

Oldest and youngest competitors

Vault 
Oldest and youngest competitors

Uneven bars 
Oldest and youngest competitors

Balance beam 
Oldest and youngest competitors

Floor 
Oldest and youngest competitors

Junior results

Team competition

Individual all-around

Vault

Uneven bars

Balance beam

Floor

Qualification

Senior

Team competition 
Due to the smaller competition roster, the team final was reduced to six teams.

Vault

Uneven bars

Balance beam

Floor

Junior

Vault

Uneven bars

Balance beam

Floor

References 

European Artistic Gymnastics Championships
European Artistic Gymnastics Championships
European Artistic Gymnastics Championships
Artistic gymnastics
Artistic gymnastics
European Artistic Gymnastics Championships
European Artistic Gymnastics Championships

Sport in Mersin
European Women's Artistic Gymnastics Championships